Thomas Joshua Elliott (born 9 November 1990) is an English footballer who plays as a striker.

A former England youth international, he graduated from the Leeds United Youth Team to win a professional contract in 2007. He spent four years with the club but made just four first team appearances, and had loan spells at Macclesfield Town, Bury, and Rotherham United. He joined Scottish Premier League club Hamilton Academical in January 2011, before moving on to Stockport County eight months later. He joined Cambridge United in May 2012, and helped the club win promotion back into the Football League after winning the 2014 Conference Premier play-off final. He joined AFC Wimbledon in 2015, winning promotion to League One via the play-offs in 2016 before being named Wimbledon's Player of the Year for the following year. After his contract expiry at Wimbledon in 2017, he joined Millwall before signing for Salford City in January 2020. After two years at the club and a loan spell at Bradford City, he was released in summer 2022.

Club career

Leeds United
Born in Leeds, Elliott began his career at hometown club Leeds United, and manager Dennis Wise handed him his first team debut at age of 16, coming on for Kevin Nicholls 81 minutes into a 2–1 defeat to Norwich City at Carrow Road on 3 February 2007. This made him the first schoolboy to appear for the Leeds first team, though not the youngest as Peter Lorimer played for United as a 15 year old in 1962. By the end of the 2006–07 season he had played in three Championship games for the "Whites". He signed a professional contract in August 2007, which would come into effect the following summer. He featured in one League Cup game in the 2007–08 season, which would be his last appearance for Leeds.

Macclesfield Town (loan)
He joined League Two side Macclesfield Town on a one-month loan on 27 January 2009, with manager Keith Alexander saying that "Much like Emile Sinclair he is an exciting prospect and gives us more attacking option". He made six appearances for the "Silkmen" during his time at Moss Rose.

Bury (loan)
He was loaned out to League Two club Bury on a three-month loan in September 2009. He scored his first professional goal on 29 September, in a 3–2 win over Crewe Alexandra at Gresty Road. After the match manager Alan Knill tipped him for a big future at Gigg Lane, however this would be his only goal for the "Shakers" in 17 appearances.

Rotherham United (loan)
He joined League Two club Rotherham United on a six-month loan deal in July 2010 as manager Ronnie Moore needed replacements for injured strikers Tom Pope and Ryan Taylor. He featured seven times for the "Millers" without scoring a goal. He struggled with hamstring problems and came in for some harsh criticism from Moore, who nicknamed him 'sicknote' and said he "is always injured and he will not play with any bit of pain so he has to grow up".

Hamilton Academical
Elliott signed a short-term deal with Scottish Premier League side Hamilton Academical in January 2011. Manager Billy Reid hoped Elliott would provide the goals to keep the "Accies" in the SPL, however he failed to hit the net and made only one start and six substitute appearances during his time at New Douglas Park. He was released in May 2011 following the club's relegation into the First Division.

Stockport County

Elliott went on trial with Bradford City, who offered him a contract in June 2011. However he did not sign the contract, and instead joined Dietmar Hamann's Stockport County, along with Hamilton teammate Jon Routledge, in August 2011. He had a poor start to his time at Edgeley Park but began to settle in at the club after manager Jim Gannon changed formation to improve service to him. Elliott was joint-leading goalscorer for County for the 2011–12 season, with eight goals in all competitions, and chose to leave the club in the summer after rejecting the offer of a new contract.

Cambridge United
Elliot was signed in May 2012 by then United manager, Jez George, on a two-year contract. On 4 December, he scored a hat-trick in a 4–2 win over Ebbsfleet United at Stonebridge Road. He ended the 2012–13 campaign with 16 goals in 33 games. He struggled with injury and featured in only 14 Conference Premier games in the 2013–14 season. He did though play the first 77 minutes of the play-off Final victory over Gateshead at Wembley Stadium, before being taken off for Adam Cunnington. On 3 February 2015, he hit the post against Manchester United in a 3–0 FA Cup defeat at Old Trafford. He finished the 2014–15 season with eight goals in 34 appearances but was one of 12 players not offered a new deal when his contract expired.

AFC Wimbledon
Elliott joined AFC Wimbledon on 2 July following his release from Cambridge; the length of this deal was not announced. He got his first league goal for Wimbledon against his former club Cambridge, despite them going on to lose 2–1. He played a part in getting Wimbledon promoted to League 1 on Monday 30 May 2016, where he started in Wimbledon's 2–0 win over Plymouth in the Play-Off Final.

In the 2016–17 season, Elliot was named AFC Wimbledon player of the season, scoring 10 goals in all competitions. He was the club's joint top scorer, along with other striker Lyle Taylor.

When his contract ran out, recently promoted Millwall of the  Championship agreed terms with Elliott on a free transfer.

Millwall
Elliott agreed a deal with Millwall on 30 May following his contract expiry from AFC Wimbledon; the length of this deal was 2 years. He scored his first goals for Millwall when he scored twice in a 2-0 EFL Cup win against Stevenage on 8 August 2017.

Salford City
After his Millwall contract expired, Elliott signed a -year deal with Salford City on 9 January 2020. On his debut for Salford he scored the winning goal in an EFL Trophy tie against Accrington Stanley on 21 January. His first league goal came on 1 February against Port Vale, scoring a header to equalise for Salford in a 1–1 draw.

Bradford City (loan)
On 27 January 2022, Elliott joined League Two rivals Bradford City on loan until the end of the 2021–22 season. He had trialled with the club, unsuccessfully, in 2011.

He was released by Salford at the end of the 2021–22 season.

International career
Elliott made his debut for the England under-16 team against Tunisia on 15 April 2006. He made his debut for the England under-18 team against Austria on 16 April 2008.

Style of play
Using his height and athleticism Elliot is extremely strong aerially and has a good work rate.

Career statistics

Honours
Cambridge United
Conference Premier play-offs: 2014

AFC Wimbledon
Football League Two play-offs: 2016

Individual
AFC Wimbledon Player of the Year: 2016–17

References

External links

1990 births
Living people
English footballers
Footballers from Leeds
Association football forwards
England youth international footballers
Leeds United F.C. players
Macclesfield Town F.C. players
Bury F.C. players
Rotherham United F.C. players
Hamilton Academical F.C. players
Stockport County F.C. players
Cambridge United F.C. players
AFC Wimbledon players
Millwall F.C. players
Salford City F.C. players
Bradford City A.F.C. players
English Football League players
Scottish Premier League players
National League (English football) players
Black British sportspeople
People educated at Mount St Mary's Catholic High School, Leeds